T Kennedy was a Tyneside songwriter from the late eighteenth and early nineteenth century. His most famous song is possibly "Geordie's Letter Frae Callerforney ".

Details 
The four most popular or best known songs written by T Kennedy are :-

 Geordie's Letter Frae Callerforney
 The Lass I Lo'e Sae Dearly
 The Moderate Man
 Sweet Tyneside

All of which appear in Songs of the Bards of the Tyne, published by P. France & Co. of Newcastle in 1840 and edited by Joseph Philip Robson.

Three of the above songs are written in the Geordie dialect

These and other minor works also appear in other Tyneside published Chapbooks from the same period including J. W. Swanston’s (of St. Andrew's Street, Newcastle upon Tyne) "Tyneside songster, containing a splendid collection of local songs by popular authors in the Northumbrian dialect"

See also 					
Geordie dialect words
France's Songs of the Bards of the Tyne - 1850
P. France & Co.
Joseph Philip Robson
The Tyneside Songster by J W Swanston

External links
 The Tyne Songster by W & T Fordyce 1840
 Songs of the Bards of the Tyne
 Farne Archives Tyneside Songster

English songwriters
People from Newcastle upon Tyne (district)
Musicians from Tyne and Wear
Geordie songwriters